Events from the year 1203 in Ireland.

Incumbent
Lord: John

Events
The House of Burke is founded during the Norman conquest
William Marshal, 1st Earl of Pembroke founded Tintern Abbey (County Wexford)

Births

Deaths